The Miss Perú 1972 pageant was held on April 12, 1972. That year, 24 candidates were competing for the national crown. The chosen winner represented Peru at the Miss Universe 1972. The rest of the finalists would enter in different pageants.

Placements

Special Awards

 Best Regional Costume - Lambayeque - Victoria Massi
 Miss Photogenic - Distrito Capital - Carmen Amelia Ampuero
 Miss Body - Madre de Dios - Nancy Simón Rivera
 Best Hair - San Martín - Nina Fernández
 Miss Congeniality - Huánuco - Erika Miovich
 Miss Elegance - Distrito Capital - Carmen Amelia Ampuero

.

Delegates

Amazonas - Kristen Gambetta
Áncash - Bertha Morales
Apurímac - Sara Flores Paredes
Ayacucho - Silvia Bedoya
Cajamarca - Angelica Vigo
Callao - Elvira Steinbach
Cuzco - Hellen Mur
Distrito Capital - Carmen Amelia Ampuero
Europe Perú - Regina Lutmann
Huancavelica - Ernestina Saenz
Huánuco - Erika Miovich
Ica - Patricia Fuller

Junín - Guiliana Prieto
La Libertad - Lourdes de Orbegozo
Lambayeque - Victoria Massi
Loreto - Susana Sanchez Caceres
Madre de Dios - Nancy Simón Rivera
Moquegua - Malena Astuariz
Piura - Marisol Beraun
Puno - Irma Villanueva
San Martín - Nina Fernández
Tacna - Panchita Piedra
Tumbes - Roxana Páez
USA Peru - Techy Raa-Schaefer

References 

Miss Peru
1972 in Peru
1972 beauty pageants